Sadie Docherty (née Boyle; born 6 June 1956) is a Scottish politician who served as Lord Provost of Glasgow from 2012 to 2017.

She belongs to the Labour Party and previously sat as a councillor for Ward 1, Linn. She worked as a manager for the Glasgow Housing Association prior to becoming Lord Provost.

Docherty was born in the Gorbals area of Glasgow to Patrick and Margaret Boyle. At age 2, the family moved to Castlemilk. She was educated at Dougrie Terrace Primary School and St Margaret Mary's Secondary School before studying Public Administration at the Glasgow College of Technology  and Scottish Local Authority Management at the University of Strathclyde.

References

External links 
City Council page

1956 births
Living people
Lord Provosts of Glasgow
People from Gorbals
Scottish Labour councillors
Women councillors in Glasgow
Alumni of the University of Strathclyde